Marina East is a planning area located in the Central Area of the Central Region of Singapore, covering  of reclaimed land.

It is the location of NTUC Club's Marina Bay Golf Course (formerly known as the Marina East Course) and the Gardens by the Bay (Bay East Garden).

Marina East is bordered by Marine Parade to the east, Kallang to the north, Marina South and Downtown Core to the west, as well as the Singapore Straits to the south. Marina East Planning Area should not be confused with the Marina East subzone that is part of the adjacent Marine Parade Planning Area.

Notes

 

 
Marine Parade